Phyllonorycter incanella is a moth of the family Gracillariidae. It is known from California, Maine and Arizona in the United States.

The wingspan is about 9 mm.

The larvae feed on Alnus species, including Alnus incana and Alnus rhombifolia. They mine the leaves of their host plant. The mine has the form of a tentiform mine on either side of the leaf

References

incanella
Moths of North America
Moths described in 1889